Dagoberto Campaneris Blanco (born March 9, 1942), nicknamed "Bert" or "Campy", is a Cuban American former professional baseball shortstop, who played Major League Baseball (MLB) for four American League (AL) teams, primarily the Kansas City / Oakland Athletics. One of the mainstays of the Athletics' championship teams of 1972 to 1974, he holds the A's franchise records for career games played (1795), hits (1882), and at bats (7180).

Campaneris led the AL in stolen bases six times between 1965 and 1972 and retired with the seventh-most steals in MLB history (649). Defensively, he led the league in putouts three times; his career totals at shortstop place him among the all-time MLB leaders in games played (5th, 2097) and double plays (7th, 1186), at that position. Campaneris is the cousin of former MLB player Jose Cardenal.

Professional career
In his debut with Kansas City on July 23, 1964, Campaneris hit two home runs, the first coming on the first pitch thrown to him by Jim Kaat of the Minnesota Twins. He is one of only five players in major league history to hit two home runs in his first game; Bob Nieman, Mark Quinn, J. P. Arencibia, and Trevor Story are the others to accomplish this feat. Just called up that day from Double-A Birmingham, he also singled, walked, and stole a base.

On July 23, 1964, Campy Campaneris was introduced on air by Monte Moore, announcer, by explaining a promotional gimmick by Charlie O. Finley, of Campy riding a donkey in from the bullpen.

In  he finished tenth in the voting for the AL's Most Valuable Player award after having a similar season at the plate but playing more regularly at shortstop.

When the Athletics moved to Oakland in 1968, Campaneris had perhaps his finest year, leading the league in hits (177), steals (62), and at bats (642); the last mark was an Oakland record until Johnny Damon broke it in 2001. 

Between June 10 and June 21, 1969, Campaneris set a major league record by stealing a base in twelve consecutive games, a record which still stands as of 2021.

Campaneris enjoyed another fine year in 1970, batting .279 with career highs of 22 home runs and 64 runs batted in while leading the league in steals for the fifth time (42) and scoring 97 runs. He improved consistently on defense; his six double plays in an extra-inning game on September 13 of that year set an AL record, and in 1972 he led AL shortstops with 795 total chances while also breaking Collins' franchise record of 376 steals.

In his postseason career of 37 games, he had eleven runs batted in (RBI) with three home runs, four doubles and a triple while also scoring fifteen runs and stealing six bases.

In Game 2 of the 1972 American League Championship Series against the Detroit Tigers, Campaneris already had three hits, two steals, and two runs when he faced pitcher Lerrin LaGrow in the seventh inning. After a pitch hit him in the ankle, Campaneris threw his bat at LaGrow. The benches cleared, with Detroit manager Billy Martin going after Campaneris; both Campaneris and LaGrow were ejected. Campaneris was fined $500 and suspended for the rest of the ALCS by American League President Joe Cronin. MLB Commissioner Bowie Kuhn added a seven-day suspension to the start of the next season but permitted Campaneris to play in the World Series victory over the Cincinnati Reds.

In the 1973 American League Championship Series, in which the A's defeated the Baltimore Orioles, he led off Game 2 with a home run, and won Game 3 with a leadoff home run in the eleventh inning; in Game 7 of the World Series against the New York Mets, both he and Reggie Jackson hit two-run home runs in the third inning off Jon Matlack—the only two home runs Oakland hit the entire series. The A's took a 4–0 lead and went on to win  to repeat as world champions; Campaneris caught Wayne Garrett's pop-up for the final out of the Series. In 1974, he broke Jimmy Dykes' franchise mark for career at bats (6 023), and in 1976, he broke Dykes' mark for games played (1,702), as well as Al Simmons' Athletics record of 1,827 career hits.

After the 1976 season, he signed with the Texas Rangers, but he saw his playing time reduced in 1978. In May 1979, he was traded to the California Angels, splitting time at shortstop over the next two seasons with Jim Anderson and Freddie Patek before playing as a reserve third baseman in 1981. 

After spending 1982 in the Mexican League, Campaneris returned to the majors for a last hurrah in 1983 with Billy Martin's New York Yankees, where he batted a career-high .322 in sixty games at second and third base before retiring.

In his 19-year career, Campaneris batted .259 with 79 home runs, 646 RBI, 1,181 runs, 2,249 hits, 313 doubles, and 86 triples in 2,328 games. His 649 stolen bases place him fourteenth in major league history, behind only Ty Cobb and Eddie Collins in the AL. Campaneris still retains the Athletics franchise records for career games (1,702), putouts (2,932), assists (5,021) and double plays (934) at shortstop.

Playing all nine positions

In 1965, Campaneris became the first player to play every position in a major league game in a thirteen-inning 5–3 loss to the California Angels at Municipal Stadium on September 8. It was an attempt by owner Charlie Finley to sell more tickets, which succeeded as the attendance that Wednesday night was 21,576. Playing a different position in each of the first nine innings, Campaneris started at shortstop, then shifted to second base, third base, left field, center field, right field, first base, pitcher, and catcher. On the mound, he pitched ambidextrously, throwing lefty to left-handers, and switched against right-handers. His night ended when he sustained a minor left shoulder injury while tagging out Ed Kirkpatrick in a collision at home plate to end the top of the ninth.

Since then, César Tovar (Twins), Scott Sheldon (Rangers), Shane Halter (Tigers, 2000), and Andrew Romine (Tigers) have joined this select list of nine-position players in a major league game. On March 12, 2015, actor Will Ferrell played in five Major League Baseball Spring training games at all nine positions to honor Campaneris.

Post-baseball career
Following his retirement, Campaneris wanted to coach in the Major Leagues, but no one gave him a chance. He then landed a few minor league opportunities, until the Seibu Lions offered him a job to coach defense and base running with them in 1987. Campaneris added a new highlight to his résumé, as the Lions won the Japan Series in both 1987 and 1988. Afterwards, Campaneris played for the Gold Coast Suns of the Senior Professional Baseball Association in its inaugural season of 1989. As the oldest everyday player in the league at 47, he hit .291 and stole 16 bases in 60 games.

Campaneris currently lives in Scottsdale, Arizona, and often participates in Old-Timers' games around the country. He also conducts baseball camps and is an active participant in the Major League Baseball Players Alumni Association, often playing in charity golf tournaments.

See also

 List of Major League Baseball annual triples leaders
 List of Major League Baseball career assists as a shortstop leaders
 List of Major League Baseball career assists leaders
 List of Major League Baseball career fielding errors as a shortstop leaders
 List of Major League Baseball career games played as a shortstop leaders
 List of Major League Baseball career hits leaders
 List of Major League Baseball career putouts as a shortstop leaders
 List of Major League Baseball career runs scored leaders
 List of Major League Baseball career stolen bases leaders
 List of Major League Baseball players from Cuba
 List of Major League Baseball players with a home run in their first major league at bat
 List of Major League Baseball stolen base records
 List of Oakland Athletics team records
 Major League Baseball titles leaders
 Oakland Athletics award winners and league leaders

References

External links

Bert Campaneris at SABR (Baseball BioProject)
Bert Campaneris at Baseball Almanac
Bert Campaneris at Pura Pelota (Venezuelan Professional Baseball League)
Bert Campaneris at ESPN Deportes: Latino Baseball Hall of Fame (inducted 2014)

1942 births
American League All-Stars
American League stolen base champions
Arizona Instructional League Athletics players
Birmingham Barons players
Binghamton Triplets players
California Angels players
Cardenales de Lara players
Columbus Clippers players
Cuban emigrants to the United States
Daytona Beach Islanders players
Gold Coast Suns (baseball) players
Kansas City Athletics players
Leones del Caracas players
Cuban expatriate baseball players in Venezuela
Lewiston Broncs players
Living people
Major League Baseball players from Cuba
Cuban expatriate baseball players in the United States
Major League Baseball shortstops
New York Yankees players
Nippon Professional Baseball coaches
Oakland Athletics players
People from Matanzas Province
Petroleros de Poza Rica players
Rojos del Águila de Veracruz players
Texas Rangers players
Cuban expatriate baseball players in Nicaragua
Cuban expatriate baseball players in Mexico